A gazetted officer is a government employee, a registered agent or a professional whose name is published in the Kenya Gazette. Gazetted officers are public administrators and official subject-matter experts who may use government letterheads, process government documents or work outside the civil service through a special license.

Examples of gazetted officers are:
A member of the service of one of the ranks of gazetted officers specified in the National Police Service Act
A member of one of the restricted professions where gazettement is a legal requirement such as geology, real estate agency, engineering, pharmacy, public health and medicine
A holder of certain government positions such as magistrates, commissioners and government chemists

A gazetted officer's name, address and qualification is entered in a public register which is updated regularly by state agencies through the Kenya Gazette. The effect of being gazetted is that a gazetted officer is at all times subject to the direct authority, control and supervision of the cabinet secretary in charge of the parent ministry thereby creating a pool of management-level professionals and special duty officers in critical departments who can be deployed without delay to control a crisis or to perform specific duties of national importance in their professional capacity such as preparation of reports, certificates and technical documents.

Like notaries, gazetted officers are the crown's eyes, ears, nose and hands on the ground - a class of public officers who may be civil servants, employees or registered agents who are the state's resource persons and who hold a position of trust as the official subject-matter-experts and specialists in state records vide the gazette who are entitled to practice their vocation and provide professional services to the public, issue certificates, make or change entries on official legal documents, superintend technical and administrative departments and institutions, send periodic reports to the government and provide consultancy and advisory services to both the government and the public.   

Gazetted officers operate under the authority of the Office of the President (head of state) and are controlled by various independent state agencies whose management is constituted by one of the president's cabinet secretaries who are roughly synonymous with crown servants. Gazetted officers provide important professional and managerial services of a public nature such as preparing and issuing government documents and tracking and monitoring key indicators such as disease outbreaks, housing trends, crime and security threats. Gazetted officers work in any gazetted or licensed institution and are forbidden from engaging in private practice and charging or collecting fees directly for their own use without a valid license.

Kenyan law courts take judicial notice of work done by gazetted officers and the corresponding entries in their record books. Legal practitioners (advocates) are officers of the court and become gazetted officers when they are appointed as senior counsel.

References

Government of Kenya